Grêmio Esportivo Renner, commonly known as Renner, was a Brazilian football club from Porto Alegre.

History
Grêmio Esportivo Renner were founded on July 27, 1931. The club, with the help of Ênio Andrade, won the Campeonato Gaúcho in 1954, thus being the first club, besides Grêmio and Internacional, to win the state championship since 1939, and would remain the only one to do so until 1998. Renner folded five years later.

Achievements

 Campeonato Gaúcho:
 Winners (1): 1954
 Campeonato Citadino de Porto Alegre:
 Winners (2): 1938, 1954

Stadium
Renner played their home games at the Tiradentes stadium. The stadium had a maximum capacity of 6,000 people.

References

Defunct football clubs in Rio Grande do Sul
Association football clubs established in 1931
Association football clubs disestablished in 1959
1931 establishments in Brazil
1959 disestablishments in Brazil